The Arizona Hotshots were a professional American football franchise based in Tempe, Arizona, and one of the eight members of the Alliance of American Football (AAF), which played one season from February 2019 to April 2019. They played their home games at Sun Devil Stadium on the campus of Arizona State University. The Hotshots were one of two AAF teams based in a city that already had an NFL team (the Arizona Cardinals; the other team was the Atlanta Legends, where the NFL's Falcons are based). The Hotshots were coached by former USFL player and college head coach Rick Neuheisel. Scott Brubaker was the team president and Phil Savage was the general manager.

On April 2, 2019, the league's football operations were reportedly suspended, and on April 4 the league allowed players to leave their contracts to sign with NFL teams. The league filed for Chapter 7 bankruptcy on April 17, 2019. At the time of the bankruptcy, the Hotshots owed over $1.2 million to Arizona State University for leasing Sun Devil Stadium.

History
Rick Neuheisel was announced as the head coach of the Arizona Hotshots by the Alliance of American Football on May 18, 2018. The team was slated to play at Sun Devil Stadium. By September 25, Scott Brubaker and Phil Savage were named team president and general manager, respectively.

Phoenix's name and logo were revealed on September 25, 2018, as the Arizona Hotshots along with the other three western teams. The name is a tribute to the region's firefighters, nicknamed hotshots, while the color scheme of green, orange, and yellow are commonly worn by such fire crews. The team's logo is a pair of crossed pickhead axes, which are used by structural firefighters and not the wildland firefighters the team is named for. The branding was developed by the national office then handed off to the team staff. Reception of the name was mixed, with some arguing it "exploits the memory of the Granite Mountain Hotshots." On March 3, 2019, the team retired No. 19 to honor the 19 Granite Mountain Hotshots killed in the Yarnell Hill Fire in 2013.

On October 11, 2018, the team named Hugh Freeze as the offensive coordinator and the rest of the coaching staff. In the 2019 AAF QB Draft, the Hotshots did not protect the assigned (by geographical method) quarterback Mike Bercovici in the first round and instead selected Trevor Knight for his speed. The final 52-man roster was set on January 30.

In January 2019, the Hotshots held their preseason camp in San Antonio. They won their season opener at Sun Devil Stadium on February 10, 2019, against the Salt Lake Stallions.

Final Roster

Allocation pool
The Hotshots owned the rights to players from designated schools:

Colleges
 Arizona
 Arizona State
 Illinois
 Nevada
 New Mexico
 New Mexico State

 Northern Arizona
 Northwestern
 Oregon State
 Texas Tech
 UCLA
 UTEP
 Wake Forest
 Washington State

The Hotshots also had rights to players unaffiliated with one of the designated schools, but who were most recently affiliated with professional teams:

National Football League (NFL)
 Arizona Cardinals
 Baltimore Ravens
 Chicago Bears
 San Francisco 49ers

Canadian Football League (CFL)
 Edmonton Eskimos

Players not affiliated with any of the designated teams could sign with any AAF team.

Staff

Notable Former Players 

 Nick Folk - Current New England Patriots Kicker
 Josh Huff - Former Philadelphia Eagles Wide Receiver, 2014 3rd Round Pick
 Steven Johnson - Former NFL 7 Year Veteran
 Rahim Moore - Former Denver Broncos Defensive Back, 2011 2nd Round Pick
 John Wolford - Current Los Angeles Rams Quarterback

2019 season

Final standings

Schedule

Preseason

Regular season
''All times local to Tempe, as Arizona does not use daylight saving time. Arizona's year-round MST is equivalent to PDT after March 9.

Game summaries

Week 1: Salt Lake

Week 2: at Memphis

Week 3: at Salt Lake

Week 4: Atlanta

Week 5: San Antonio

Week 6: at Orlando

In an upset, the Hotshots beat the Apollos to ruin their chances at a perfect season. (They fall to 5–1) With the win, they improve to 3–3.

Week 7: San Diego

Week 8: at San Antonio

Media
In addition to league-wide television coverage through NFL Network, CBS Sports Network, TNT, and B/R Live, Hotshots' games were also broadcast on local radio by KDUS, an NBC Sports Radio affiliate.

References

Further reading
 

 
2018 establishments in Arizona
2019 disestablishments in Arizona